The International Journal of Pharmaceutics is a peer-reviewed medical journal covering physical, chemical, biological, microbiological, and engineering studies related to the conception, design, production, characterization, and evaluation of drug delivery systems in vitro and in vivo.

External links 
 

Elsevier academic journals
English-language journals
Pharmacology journals
Publications established in 1978